IrremeDIABLE is the ninth studio album by the French band Misanthrope. It is also the first concept album by the band, being based on the life and works of Charles Baudelaire. This album was released in two versions: the single CD, and a limited deluxe box containing a CD and a DVD. A video-clip of "Névrose" was made as well.

Track listing

References 

2008 albums
Concept albums
Cultural depictions of Charles Baudelaire
Misanthrope (band) albums